Achilus is the type genus of planthoppers of the family Achilidae. This may be a monotypic genus containing the type species Achilus flammeus.Kirby, 1818: which is the "red fingernail bug" and found in Australia. The placement of A. cixioides Spinola from Chile, is uncertain, but it may belong in Mnemosyne Stål, 1866 (Cixiinae}. The genus described by William Kirby in 1819.

References

Further reading

External Links 

 

Auchenorrhyncha genera
Achilidae
Hemiptera of Australia
Monotypic Hemiptera genera